La Sentinelle is a company based in Baie-du-Tombeau, Mauritius. The company operations include newspapers, designing, printing, advertising, publishing of specialized magazines and newsletters. The company have recently gone digital and through the "lsldigital" , it proposes news in visual and audio format and have further spread its reach through its brand L'Express.

See also

 List of newspapers in Mauritius
 List of magazines in Mauritius
 List of radio stations in Mauritius

References

 Le Code de déontologie des journalistes 
 Maurice : le groupe de presse La Sentinelle fait le pari du numérique

Mass media companies of Mauritius
Mass media companies established in 1963
1963 establishments in Mauritius